Fogars de Montclús is a municipality in the province of Barcelona and autonomous community of Catalonia, Spain.

See also 
 Montseny Massif
 Santa Fe Reservoir

References

External links
 Government data pages 

Municipalities in Vallès Oriental